The brainchild of the classical guitarist and banjo and lute performer Douglas Back, Fretworks Mandolin and Guitar Orchestra was the first public-school-affiliated mandolin youth ensemble in America.

History

The orchestra, based in Montgomery, Alabama, consisted of an ever morphing lineup of 13- to 18-year-olds over several years who represented the most talented musicians at the Baldwin Arts and Academic Magnet School as well as talented alumni. The ensemble utilized several unconventional instruments including the mandola, mandocello, classical banjo, tenor banjo, and octave mandolin in addition to the more conventional mandolin and classical guitar.

Due to their unique position as a one-of-a-kind ensemble and through the guidance of Back, the group achieved moderate success and notoriety in the mandolin and classical guitar worlds and regularly performed at music festivals around the country. In addition to such performances, Fretworks also recorded a total of three albums over the course of its life including El Cumbanchero, Cathedral Hill, and a self-titled CD released in 2003 featuring a suite composed by the composer John Goodin as well as a "Divertimento for Mandolin Orchestra" composed by Lynette Morse, both of which being specifically written for the group. Perhaps, however, the most notable achievement attained by the ensemble was the 2003 performance on the National Public Radio show From the Top which introduced Fretworks to a national radio audience of roughly 25 million people.

In 2006, they released a new CD, New Harmony.

Performers 

The lineup from the self-titled album is as follows:

1st Mandolin
 Robert Thornhill - Concertmaster
 Aaron Shows
 James Nichols
2nd Mandolin
 Morgan Dowdy - Principal
 Taylor Hall
 Joey Nelson
Mandola
 Logan Yates - Principal
 Collin Taylor
 Joey McElvy
 Wilson Franklin
Mandocello
 Collin Taylor
Guitar
 Mark Edwards - Principal
 Joel Littlepage
 Ruddy Thompson
 Scott Redding
 Travis Manuel
Plectrum Banjo
 Joey McElvy
Contrabass Guitar
 Alesia Davidson
Percussion
 Aaron Shows - Drums
 Joel Littlepage - Egg Shaker

External links

Douglas Back
From the Top
Mandolin Cafe - See March 3
Mandolin Cafe - See December 23
Lynette Morse
Cathedral Hill
Bethlehem on the Ohio
New Harmony
additional press

American youth orchestras
Mandolin orchestras
Musical groups from Alabama
Youth organizations based in Alabama
Organizations based in Montgomery, Alabama
Performing arts in Alabama